Hugo von Tschudi (1851–1911) was an art historian and museum curator. He was director of the Nationalgalerie in Berlin (1896–1909) where he acquired many important Impressionist works. Tschudi was born in Austria and became a naturalised Swiss citizen.

About

Tschudi arrived as director of the Nationalgalerie in 1896. He immediately set about the acquisition of modern French painting, securing In the Conservatory (Au jardin d’hiver) by Édouard Manet from 1879, and the first Paul Cézanne to enter any public collection anywhere followed the next year in July 1897. Other works by Renoir, Monet, Pissarro and Degas joined them. However, Gauguin's controversial masterpiece The Birth of Christ, from 1896, would prove Tschudi's undoing. The contemporary work, mixing the sacred with the profane and the primitive, was not generally appreciated by most Europeans at the time. In particular, it was intensely disapproved of by Kaiser Wilhelm. In 1909 he at first loaned the painting to the institution but was promptly dismissed from his position by the Kaiser. Tschudi was given a new job as director of the Neue Pinakothek in Munich, in the Kingdom of Bavaria, which he continued to manage until his death in 1911. He took the new Gauguin painting with him to Munich, where it remains in the permanent art collection there. 

Between 1909 and 1914 the so-called "Tschudi Contributions" brought a remarkable collection of masterpieces of Impressionism and Post-Impressionism to the Bavarian State Collections in Munich. Tschudi, serving as the general director of the collections, acquired 44 paintings, nine sculptures and 22 drawings, mostly from emerging French artists. In Bavaria public funds could not be used to buy such works, but Tschudi's associates were able to find the money to complete the purchases with private contributions after his death in 1911.

Books
Ausstellungskatalog Berlin, München: Manet bis van Gogh, Hugo von Tschudi und der Kampf um die Moderne. Prestel-Verlag 1996 
Barbara Paul: Hugo von Tschudi und die moderne französische Kunst im Deutschen Kaiserreich. Zabern-Verlag 2001

External links
 
 Hugo von Tschudi Dictionary of Art Historians 

Austrian art historians
Swiss art historians
1851 births
1911 deaths